Summer Sail 2007 was a sailing festival sponsored by the American Sail Training Association (ASTA) as part of the larger ASTA Tall Ships Challenge 2007, which continued until September 2007. Well-known tall ships such as Prince William, Bluenose II and A.J. Meerwald were expected to attend. The event, hosted by the   Philadelphia Ship Preservation Guild, was expected to attract 10,000 visitors from all over the world. The event, with ship tours, live entertainment, music, crafts and food, was held June 19 to June 23, 2007, at Penn's Landing in Philadelphia, Pennsylvania.  The festival was part of ASTA's ongoing goal of educating the North American public in sailing techniques, Atlantic ocean conservation, and maritime history. Many of the member ships such as Philadelphia Ship Preservation Guild's barkentine Gazela and the privately owned Canadian barque Picton Castle sail all over the Middle Atlantic Ocean and the Caribbean Sea, giving tours and doing educational outreach whenever they are in port.

References

External links 
 Official ASTA website
 Official A.J. Meerwald Site
 Philadelphia Ship Preservation Guild and Gazela's official site

Sailing festivals
Boat festivals
Sports festivals in the United States